Paula Kania and Polina Pekhova were the defending champions, but Kania chose not to participate.  Pekhova played alongside Ksenia Palkina, but lost in the first round to Tímea Babos and Yaroslava Shvedova.
Babos and Shvedova went on to win the title, defeating Olga Govortsova and Mandy Minella in the final, 6–3, 6–3.

Seeds

Draw

Draw

References
 Main Draw

Tashkent Open - Doubles
2013 Tashkent Open